Toundoute is a commune in Ouarzazate Province, Drâa-Tafilalet, administrative region of Morocco. At the time of the 2004 census, the commune had a total population of 11,877 people living in 1689 households.

References

Populated places in Ouarzazate Province
Rural communes of Drâa-Tafilalet